The Third Succession Act of King Henry VIII's reign, passed by the Parliament of England in July 1543, returned his daughters Mary and Elizabeth to the line of the succession behind their half-brother Edward. Born in 1537, Edward was the son of Henry VIII and his third wife, Jane Seymour, and heir apparent to the throne.

History

Title and dating 
The Act did not have a title in the modern sense. It is formally cited as 35 Hen. 8 c. 1 (meaning the first Act passed in the 35th year of Henry VIII's reign), and referred to by historians as the Succession to the Crown Act 1543 or the Act of Succession 1543. The royal assent was given to this bill in the spring of 1544 at the conclusion of the 1543/1544 Parliament, but until 1793 acts were usually backdated to the beginning of the session of Parliament in which they were passed; as such the Act is also often dated 1544.

Relationship to First and Second Succession Acts 
The Third Succession Act superseded the First Succession Act (1533) and the Second Succession Act (1536), whose effects had been to declare bastards Henry's daughters Mary and Elizabeth, and to remove them from succession to the throne. This new act returned both Mary and Elizabeth to the line of succession behind Edward, any potential children of Edward, and any potential children of Henry by his then wife, Catherine Parr, or any future wife Henry might have.

With the 1536 Act, Henry VIII was authorised to dispose of the Crown by letters patent or by will, in default of any legitimate heirs after Mary and Elizabeth. Mary and Elizabeth, who had both been declared illegitimate and incapable to inherit, were not restored to legitimacy in the 1543/44 Act; they were only restored to succession of the Crown (with several provisos stipulated in his will of 1547, such as they could not marry without the Privy Council's approval). This meant that the place in the succession of Mary and Elizabeth remained doubtful.

Historical effect 

The Treason Act 1547 made it high treason to interrupt the line of succession to the throne established by the Act of Succession. Edward VI meant to bypass this Act in his "Devise for the Succession", issued as letters patent on 21 June 1553, in which he named Lady Jane Grey as his successor. Prevailing over Lady Jane Grey, Mary ascended the throne under the terms of the Third Succession Act.

See also 
 Succession to the British throne
 Alternative successions of the English and British crown

Notes

Further reading

External links 
 
 

1543 in law
1543 in England
Acts of the Parliament of England
Succession to the Crown Act 1543
Succession acts
Henry VIII
Edward VI of England
Mary I of England
Elizabeth I